Velvet blight is a disease that affects the stems, branches, leaves, fruits or trunks of plants and trees. This disease is primarily caused by three fungal species from the genus Septobasidium: S. bogoriense, S. pilosum and S. theae.

It is known to affect mainly tea plants (genus Thea).
The most studied of these species is S. bogoriense, most notably due to the work of Ernst Albert Gäumann. S. bogoriense is named after the Herbarium Bogoriense (Bogor, West Java, Indonesia) which is the place where it was first identified on the bark of an unspecified tree and named by E. Nyman on June 3, 1898. This species was also listed in Otto Warburg's Monsunia in 1900.

Distribution 

This disease is mainly found in tropical climates in Southern Asia, however some scattering exists:

S. bogoriense 

 Java, Indonesia
 Sri Lanka
 Tonkin, China
 Japan
 North Queensland, Australia
 West Indies
 La Campana, Panama
 Northern Vietnam
 Washington, USA 
 India

S. pilosum 

 Java, Indonesia
 Taiwan
 Baton Rouge, Louisiana, USA
 Florida, USA

S. theae 

 Java, Indonesia
 Lam dong, Viet Nam

Known primary hosts

S. bogoriense 

Coffea, Cinchona, Thea, Broussonetia, Morus, Citrus, Manihot, Ficus elastica, Solanum quitoense, Erythrina, Crotalaria sp., Tephrosia candida, Leucaena glauca, Sesbania aegyptiaca, Lantana, Stachytarpheta mutabilis, Paritium, Calosanthes indica, Fraxinus, Marsdenia, Piper nigrum, Polyosma, Rosa, Wigandia kunthii, Macaranga tanarius, Bougainvillea, Hibiscus rosa sub.sp. sinensis, and sub.sp. mangifera.

S. pilosum 

Thea, Mangifera indica, Magnolia virginiana, and Artabotrys.

S. theae 

Thea.

References

Further reading 
 Warburg, Otto. Monsunia: Beiträge zur Kenntniss der Vegetation des süd-und ostasiatischen Monsungebietes. Vol. 1. W. Engelmann, 1900.
 Sarma, Y. R., N. Ramachandran, and M. Anandaraj. "Black pepper diseases in India." In: Diseases of Black Pepper. Proceedings of the Int. Pepper Comm. Wkshop. in Jt. Res. for Control of Black Pepper Diseases (1988): 27–29.
 Couch, John Nathaniel. "A monograph of Septobasidium. Part I. Jamaican species." Jour. Elisha Mitchell Soc 44 (1929): 242–260.

External links 

Fungal plant pathogens and diseases
Tea diseases